Rohit David (born 22 October 1985) is a former Norwegian darts player.

Career

David qualified for the televised stages of the 2012 Winmau World Masters, and defeated three-time former champion Martin Adams 3–1 in the last 32.

David qualified for the 2013 BDO World Championship via the International Playoffs. He played Wesley Harms in the first round losing to Harms 3–1.

David's sister, Rachna, plays on the BDO women's circuit. The David family are of Indian extraction.

World Championship results

BDO

2013: 1st Round: (lost to Wesley Harms 1–3)

References

1985 births
Living people
Norwegian darts players
Norwegian people of Indian descent
British Darts Organisation players